The 1899 Tipperary Senior Hurling Championship was the 10th staging of the Tipperary Senior Hurling Championship since its establishment by the Tipperary County Board in 1887.

Horse & Jockey won the championship after a 3–08 to 2–04 defeat of Tow-Mile Borris in the final replay. It was the club's only championship title.

References

Tipperary
Tipperary Senior Hurling Championship